U-94 may refer to one of the following German submarines:

 , a Type Mittel U submarine launched in 1917 and that served in the First World War until surrendered on 20 November 1918; broken up at Bo'ness in 1920–21
 During the First World War, Germany also had these submarines with similar names:
 , a Type UB III submarine launched in 1918 and surrendered on 22 November 1918; became French submarine Trinité Schillemans until 24 July 1935; broken up
 , a Type UC III submarine launched in 1918 and surrendered on 26 November 1918; broken up at Taranto in August 1919. Conducted no war patrols and sank no ships.
 , a Type VIIC submarine that served in the Second World War until sunk on 28 August 1942

Submarines of Germany